Institut de pastorale des Dominicains is the Montreal, Quebec branch of the Dominican University College / Collège Universitaire Dominicain, a Roman Catholic university based in Ottawa, Ontario. The institute offers, in French, programs in pastoral or liturgical theology or in catechism, leading to university certificates and bachelor's degrees.

Programs

 L'Institut de pastorale des Dominicains in Montreal offers, in French, programs in pastoral or liturgical theology or in catechism, leading to university certificates and bachelor's degrees.
 L'Institut was founded in 1960 in Montreal, Quebec by the Dominican Order during the construction of the Convent Saint-Albert-le-Grand. L'Institut partnered with the Dominican College in Ottawa, Ontario and acquired university status in 1967. 
 The institute consists of ten professors and two staff. 
 The director and registrar is Denis Gagnon.
 The motto is "C'est l'université à taille humaine" (This is the university with a human dimension)

2019 crisis

Near the end of 2019, under serious financial stress, a conflict developed between the institute and the college, and the director was fired, as well as the interim director later. Two teachers resigned as consequence as well as the dean of the theology faculty.

References

External links

Dominican University College main website
Institut de pastorale website
University's main website
Canadian Dominicans
University's Online Library Catalog

Buildings and structures in Montreal
Christian education in Canada
Education in Montreal
Seminaries and theological colleges in Canada
Catholicism in Canada